Phyllosticta pseudocapsici is a fungal plant pathogen infecting Jerusalem cherries.

References

External links
 USDA ARS Fungal Database

Fungal plant pathogens and diseases
Ornamental plant pathogens and diseases
pseudocapsici
Fungi described in 1882
Taxa named by Casimir Roumeguère